Mabel Blundell Heynemann  (1866–6 January 1952) was a British archaeologist and antiquarian.

Biography
Mabel grew up in Keighley and lived in Appletreewick and Bradford. She was one of the earliest members of the Brontë Society and was elected as a member of its Council in 1930; a position she retained for the rest of her life. She also served as Vice-President of the Society. Heynemann was a founder-member of the Yorkshire Numismatic Society and a fellow of the Society of Antiquaries of London. When she was elected as a fellow she was then the only Yorkshirewoman in the society.

Publications
Heynemann, M.B. 1947. Appletreewick and District. Shipley.

References

1866 births
1952 deaths
20th-century archaeologists
British women archaeologists
Fellows of the Society of Antiquaries of London
People from Keighley